Little Bay is a town located on the island of Newfoundland in the Canadian province of Newfoundland and Labrador.  Its current population is roughly 100 people.  It is located in Green Bay, which is part of Notre Dame Bay, and located in the central part of Newfoundland.

Founded in 1878 and incorporated in 1966, the town of Little Bay is a historic mining community which boomed during the last decades of the 19th century and declined due to the loss of its primary industry and disaster by fires at the turn of the 20th century.

Some towns near Little Bay include Beachside, St Patrick's, Little Bay Islands, and the main center for Green Bay, Springdale.

History 
Little Bay was founded in the summer of 1878 by Baron Franz von Ellershausen, a German industrialist, after the accidental discovery of a copper ore deposit by a local hunter named Robert Colbourne. The town site which was previously an unoccupied wilderness claimed a population of over 500 people by the end of its first year and would witness a peak population of over 2,000 residents by 1891 making it one of the largest communities on the island at the time. The town became a hub of culture and commerce and was recognized as the unofficial capitol of the Northern mining region. Little Bay mine was among the top copper producers in the world and referred to as “the gem of the island” and "the el Dorado of Newfoundland” in media coverage from the era. Newfoundland mining was expected to overtake fishing as the colony’s main export with Little Bay leading this effort. The mining town attracted both local and international media attention as a result and plans were made to connect Little Bay to St. John’s by railroad.  

Historic Little Bay could boast several late 19th century luxuries such as a telegraph office, hospital, public hall, court house, hotel, advanced industrial wharfage, and a regionally competitive cricket team.  During its boom years Little Bay hosted several notable visitors including Lurana W. Sheldon, Gustav Kobbé,  William Kennedy,  John McDonald, James Patrick Howley, Wilfred Grenfell, John Hawley Glover, Henry Arthur Blake,  Terence O’Brien, and even  Prince George although the last didn't make shore and remained in Little Bay's harbour onboard the  HMS Canada.

Little Bay's heyday was not to last. Mining operations declined and the late 1890s saw a mass exodus of miners to the mines in Glace Bay, Nova Scotia. The closing of Little Bay mine was followed by two devastating fires in 1903 and 1904. The population was reduced to less than 200 people from a population of over 2,000 in short order. Among those to depart were the literate and educated members of the upper class. The loss of documents to the fires, the subsequent lack of written records that followed, and the loss of media attention both locally and internationally resulted in Little Bay being largely forgotten by the rest of the world while locally living memories were gradually reduced to snippets of oral history.

The town saw a brief resurgence of mining operations during the 1960s but never returned to its former 19th century population or influence.

Heritage 
Little Bay’s contribution to Newfoundland's heritage may have remained in the domain of lost history were it not for a couple of sluthey researchers. The first was Wendy Martin with her work “Once Upon a Mine” in 1983 which placed Little Bay's mine in context by exploring Newfoundland’s mining history. The second was Doyle Wells who transcribed and published the diaries of his ancestor, Little Bay’s 19th century police Sergeant Thomas Wells in his text “All Quiet” in 2012 thereby showing the day to day life of the town. However, the true scale of the town’s forgotten history was finally uncovered by Grand Falls-Windsor based heritage researcher Ian Evans. Evans, benefitting from modern efforts to digitize historic media documents, approached Little Bay's history as a lost media project. Little Bay was unusual in that it had been excessively documented during its first decades. Those sources were now uploaded onto various online archives. Evans was thereby able to construct a catalogue containing thousands of late 19th century newspaper references and personal accounts of the town during its historic boom. 

Current efforts are underway in Little Bay to highlight the town's unique place in Newfoundland history and to thereby demonstrate the potential benefit it holds for local heritage tourism. This work is championed by Little Bay Mayor Phyllis Dobbin Simms and aided greatly by Conestoga College’s Dea Watson. Their efforts have engaged with and been supported by the community of Little Bay and are now attracting a growing public interest in the town and its history. Through Little Bay's ongoing community efforts the town has recently formed a heritage society, established the el Dorado walking trail, and have set the date for Little Bay's first Summer Heritage Day as August 12th of 2023 in celebration of the town's 145th birthday.

Demographics 
It can be difficult to compare historical demographic information on the town to current information as other nearby communities such as St. Patricks, Shoal Arm, Coffee Cove, and Otter Island were once considered to be part of Little Bay.

Notable people
 John Bernard Croak - Little Bay born recipient of the Victoria Cross for actions performed on August 8, 1918 at Amiens, France during the First World War
 Francis Thomas Lind - well known soldier born in Little Bay killed during the First World War. Later known for the posthumous publishing of his wartime correspondence.

Sister Towns
Betts Cove
Ellershouse, Nova Scotia

See also
 Heritage Foundation of Newfoundland and Labrador
History of Little Bay
 List of communities in Newfoundland and Labrador

References 

Populated places in Newfoundland and Labrador
Mining communities in Newfoundland and Labrador
Populated coastal places in Canada
Towns in Newfoundland and Labrador